The women's changquan three events combined competition (Changquan, Qiangshu and Jianshu) at the 2002 Asian Games in Busan, South Korea was held from 10 to 13 October at the Dongseo University Minseok Sports Center.

Schedule
All times are Korea Standard Time (UTC+09:00)

Results
Legend
DNS — Did not start

References

2002 Asian Games Report, Page 794
Results

Women's changquan